The Interim National Assembly was the legislative body of the Third Czechoslovak Republic from 28 October 1945 to June 1946. All 300 members of the assembly were from the National Front.

It was succeeded by the Constituent National Assembly, which sat for another two years before the democratic government was overthrown in the 1948 Czechoslovak coup d'état.

References

Defunct unicameral legislatures
Parliaments of Czechoslovakia
Provisional governments
1945 establishments in Czechoslovakia
1946 disestablishments in Czechoslovakia